Plattsburg is an unincorporated community in Monroe Township, Washington County, in the U.S. state of Indiana.

History
A post office was established at Plattsburg in 1844, but was soon discontinued, in 1845.

Geography

References

Unincorporated communities in Washington County, Indiana
Unincorporated communities in Indiana
Louisville metropolitan area